Laurence Suhner (born 1 May 1968) is a Swiss science fiction writer and graphic artist.

Born in Geneva, Suhner studied Indian dance and music and attended four semesters of physics courses at the University of Geneva. She published several graphic novels in the 1980s and 2000s, and started writing prose science fiction in 2006.

Her first novel, the hard SF planetary romance Vestiges, was published in 2012. It received the 2013 Futuriales Révélation Adulte award, as well as the 2013 Prix Bob Morane for best French language novel. The novel is the first of the QuanTika trilogy, of which the second volume, L'ouvreur des chemins, was published in 2013 and the third, Origines, in 2015.

Suhner teaches creative writing at the University of Geneva.

Works
Novel
QuanTika trilogy
 
 
 

Novellas
2017: The Perfect Chord, translated by Sheryl Curtis, in: Anomaly 25
 2010: Homéostasie, in Dimension Suisse : une anthologie de science-fiction romande, Rivière Blanche, 2010.
 2009: Timhkâ, in : Galaxies nouvelle série n° 4/46, GALAXIES 3A, April 2009
 2006 : GeneV 2106, in La Tribune de Genève, Numéro spécial science-fiction suisse, 2006.

Comics
 2007: Confidences, writer and artist, in Mes Semblables, ouvrage Collectif, published by ACOR SOS Racisme Suisse
 2007: Le Chaman, writer and artist, in Virus
 2006: Eclipse, artist, in Pompiers volontaires
 2004: Dame Jeanne, writer and artist, in La Vie en Verre
 2002: Le Secret de Chimneys, artist, published by Emmanuel Proust, ; an adaptation of The Secret of Chimneys by Agatha Christie
 2000: Éclats d'Âme, artist, published by Drozophile 
1987: Zoto Zata ou la statue perdue, published by Ed. Jean-Marie Bouchain.
1984: Rastapanique, published by Ed. Jean-Marie Bouchain.

Short stories
 2017: "The terminator", published in Nature

References

External links

Quantika website

Swiss science fiction writers
Swiss women writers
Swiss comics artists
Living people
Women science fiction and fantasy writers
1968 births
Writers from Geneva
Swiss female comics artists